Billy and Percy is a 1974 Australian docudrama based on the relationship between Prime Minister Billy Hughes and his private secretary Percy Deane during World War I. It was based primarily on Deane's diaries.

Reception 
John Power won an AFI award for best director.

Awards
1974–75 AFI Awards:
Best Actor in a Leading Role: Won (Martin Vaughan)
Best Direction: Won (John Power)
1975 Logie Awards:
Best Dramatised Documentary Series: Won

References

External links

Billy and Percy at Australian Screen Online

Australian drama television films
1974 television films
1974 films
1970s English-language films
Films directed by John Power
1970s Australian films